Prodromos Bodosakis-Athanasiadis (1890–1979) was one of the most important figures in 20th century Greek industrial history. He created an immense industrial empire with weapons factories, mines and plants in diverse branches of industry in the 1930s.

Early life
He was born to a Cappadocian Greek family in the region of Bor, Cappadocia, Asia minor in 1890. Prodomos migrated to Greece after the Greco-Turkish War (1919–22). From 1934, he controlled the Pyrkal, one of the oldest Greek defence industries with significant contribution during the Greco-Italian War.

References

1890 births
1979 deaths
Greek philanthropists
Cappadocian Greeks
Knights Commander of the Order of Merit of the Federal Republic of Germany
20th-century philanthropists
20th-century Greek businesspeople
People from Bor, Niğde
Emigrants from the Ottoman Empire to Greece